Jodocus "Jody" David Campbell (born March 4, 1960 in Bellflower, California) is a former water polo player who won silver medals for the United States at the 1984 Summer Olympics in Los Angeles, California and the 1988 Summer Olympics in Seoul, South Korea. He is a graduate of Stanford University. In 1994, he was inducted into the USA Water Polo Hall of Fame.

See also
 List of Olympic medalists in water polo (men)

References

External links
 

1960 births
Living people
American male water polo players
Olympic silver medalists for the United States in water polo
Water polo players at the 1984 Summer Olympics
Water polo players at the 1988 Summer Olympics
Stanford Cardinal men's water polo players
Sportspeople from Los Angeles County, California
Place of birth missing (living people)
People from Bellflower, California
Medalists at the 1988 Summer Olympics
Medalists at the 1984 Summer Olympics
Wilson Classical High School alumni